Thanbankyun  is a village in Bhamo Township, Bhamo District, Kachin State of north-eastern Myanmar.  It is located across the Irrawaddy River from the village of Man Pu, a few miles west of a town called Mansi.

References

External links
Satellite map at Maplandia.com

Populated places in Kachin State
Bhamo Township